María Flores-Wurmser (born 28 July 1971) is a Guatemalan gymnast. She competed in five events at the 1988 Summer Olympics.

References

1971 births
Living people
Guatemalan female artistic gymnasts
Olympic gymnasts of Guatemala
Gymnasts at the 1988 Summer Olympics
Place of birth missing (living people)